Demonic is a 2015 American supernatural horror film directed by Will Canon, and written by Max La Bella, Doug Simon and Will Canon. The film stars Maria Bello, Frank Grillo, Cody Horn, Dustin Milligan, Megan Park, Scott Mechlowicz, Aaron Yoo, and Alex Goode.

Plot
A violent slaughter occurs in an abandoned house in Louisiana where three college students are found dead. Detective Mark Lewis (Frank Grillo) examines the crime scene and finds a shocked survivor, John (Dustin Milligan), before calling reinforcements. Several police cars then arrive at the house alongside an ambulance with psychologist, Dr. Elizabeth Klein (Maria Bello). She talks to John, who tells her that a seance performed in the house called the attention of many spirits, including one he identified as his mother, and that two of the group members – his pregnant girlfriend, Michelle (Cody Horn), and her ex-boyfriend, Bryan (Scott Mechlowicz) – are still missing.

The following scenes consist of two interlaced plots: one shows the interrogation of John by Dr. Klein and the investigation of videotapes found in the house by police officers, and the other shows the actual events (often filmed by a camera) that John and the five other visitors of the house experienced, including several paranormal phenomena.

Bryan is later found alive but runs away from the police, ending up cornered in a store. John hears the news on the police radio and, in a fit of rage, grabs a radio, shouting at Bryan to tell him where Michelle is. Bryan begins to act strangely while John almost goes into cardiac arrest. Elizabeth screams for Mark to stop Bryan before he kills John, wherein Mark promptly shoots Bryan dead.

Mark returns to the house and discovers a secret area where he finds Michelle. As the paramedics are rolling her on the stretcher, Elizabeth discovers that John killed everybody at the same time that Detective Mark finds John's lifeless body hanging.

As it turns out, the "John" that Elizabeth was interrogating was the demon, who, as he begins to make Elizabeth choke, elaborates on the events that transpired – the seal the group found in the living room is what bound him to the house; John's mother was supposed to be the vessel of his escape, his possessing John, killing everybody and that he needs to cross the seal – in order to set himself free. The lights begin to turn on and off, and as Mark bursts open the door, he vanishes just as Michelle is wheeled out of the house.

The film concludes with Michelle in the ambulance showing a sinister figure moving in her belly.

Cast 
Maria Bello as Dr. Elizabeth Klein
Frank Grillo as Detective Mark Lewis
Cody Horn as Michelle
Dustin Milligan as John
Megan Park as Jules
Scott Mechlowicz as Bryan 
Aaron Yoo as Donnie
Tyson Sullivan as Luke Elton
Alex Goode as Sam
Ashton Leigh as Sara Mathews
Terence Rosemore as Jenkins
Jesse Steccato as Peter
Meyer DeLeeuw as Henry
Griff Furst as Reeves
Billy Slaughter as EMT Wayne
Elena Satine as Jane

Production 
On May 13, 2011, the film was announced under the title House of Horror, with James Wan set to produce. On November 22, 2011, it was announced Xavier Gens would direct the film. On January 23, 2013, Maria Bello and Frank Grillo joined the cast. On October 8, 2013, the film was retitled Demonic. On July 31, 2014, it was announced that the film would be released on December 12, 2014. On September 19, 2014, the film was pushed back to an unknown date.

Release 
The film premiered on 12 February 2015 in Brazil under the title A Casa dos Mortos, which translates as The House of the Dead.
The film also premiered on 8 May 2015 in Turkey. The film's Turkish title is Şeytani Ruhlar which means Satanic Spirits. The movie was released in Mexico on August 21, 2015 under the title Demoníaco, a direct translation of the original title. The film is no longer on Netflix in the US but might still be in the UK and got its US premiere on Spike TV on 27 July 2017.

References

External links 
 

2015 films
2015 horror films
American supernatural horror films
The Devil in film
Films produced by James Wan
Dimension Films films
2010s English-language films
2010s American films